Le mataf is a 1973 drama film directed by Serge Leroy and starring Michel Constantin.

Plot
Three bank robbers, "Le Mataf", Basilio and Franck, are preparing to conduct a hold-up when they witness a young woman being thrown out of a window by two men. The two killers manage to take compromising photos of Mataf and his gang, and coerce them into stealing a microfilm. The gang receives as a down payment a suitcase containing .

Cast
 Michel Constantin as Bernard Solville
 Adolfo Celi as Me Desbordes
 Georges Géret as Basilio Hagon
 Annie Cordy as Nina
 Cathy Rosier as Cathy Mondor
 Pierre Santini as Frank Mazier
 Bob Asklöf as Bob (billed as Bob Asklof)
 Billy Kearns
 Carl Studer as Sam
 Julie Dassin as Madeleine
 Michèle Delacroix
 Danielle Durou
 Lucien Duval
 Robert Favart
 Antonella Lolito
 Pippo Merisi as Jackie the Eel
 Carlo Nell
 Jacques Rispal as Nurse
 Pierre Zannier

External links

1973 films
1973 drama films
1970s heist films
1970s French-language films
French crime drama films
French gangster films
French heist films
Italian crime drama films
Italian gangster films
Italian heist films
Films scored by Stelvio Cipriani
1970s French films
1970s Italian films